The Antonov A-11 is a single-seat, high performance, all-metal sailplane built in the Soviet Union in the late 1950s. 150 were produced.

Design and development

The almost all-metal A-11 was Antonov's first non-wood framed sailplane.  It is a cantilever  mid-wing monoplane, with straight tapered wings mostly swept on the trailing edge and set with 1.5° of dihedral but no washout.  A single spar with a metal-skinned leading edge forward of it and fabric covering aft forms most of the span but the curved tips are supported by twin spars. The fabric-covered ailerons are slotted, with set-back hinges and mass balances.  They can be drooped together through 8° to act as flaps.  Inboard, there are slotted flaps on the trailing edges and spoilers, mounted at mid-chord and quite close to the fuselage, of the gapless kind opening upwards only.

The fuselage of the A-11 is a metal monocoque of pod and boom form, with a gradual transition between the two.  It carries an all-metal, straight edged 90° V- or butterfly tail, its control surfaces mass-balanced with external weights.  The three-piece canopy stretches smoothly from the nose to above mid-chord without a stepped windscreen. There is a retractable monowheel undercarriage, sprung but without brakes, assisted by a rubber-mounted skid forward of the wheel and a tail bumper aft, formed by a short, shallow ventral fin

The A-11 first flew on 12 May 1958.  It was approved for aerobatics, spins and cloud flying.

Aircraft on display
Information from Ogden
Central Russian Air Force Museum, Monino 
Panevezys Airfield Monument

Specifications (Antonov A-11)

See also

Notes

References

Bibliography

1950s Soviet sailplanes
A-11
Glider aircraft
Aircraft first flown in 1958
V-tail aircraft